Korotygino is a rural locality (a village) in Yurovskoye Rural Settlement, Gryazovetsky District, Vologda Oblast, Russia. The population was 188 as of 2002. There are 2 streets.

Geography 
Korotygino is located 28 km northwest of Gryazovets (the district's administrative centre) by road. Andrakovo is the nearest rural locality.

References 

Rural localities in Gryazovetsky District